Austin is an English surname, an Old French language contraction of Agustin as Aostin and Austin (regular disappearing of intervocalic [g] from Late Latin to Old French; compare month August: Old French aüst/aoust, French août). Agustin is the popular form of Augustin, equivalent to Augustine.

Notable people with the surname "Austin" include

A
Aaron Austin (1745–1829) Justice of the Connecticut Supreme Court

Alana Austin (born 1982), American actress
Albert Austin (disambiguation), multiple people
Alfred Austin (1835–1913), British poet
Alfredo López Austin (1936–2021), Mexican historian
Alice Constance Austin (1862–1930), American architect
Alicia Austin (born 1942), American author
Alvin O. Austin (born 1942), American academic administrator
Amanda Austin (1859–1917), American painter and sculptor
Andrew Austin (disambiguation), multiple people
Ann Austin (n.d.–1665), Quaker preacher
Annie Austin, English academic administrator
Archibald Austin (1772–1837), American politician
Arthur Austin (disambiguation), multiple people
Ato Austin (n.d.–1998), Ghanaian politician
Austin Austin (1855–1925), Australian politician

B
Barry Austin (1968–2021), British heavy man
Ben Austin (disambiguation), multiple people
Bernard Austin (disambiguation), multiple people
Bill Austin (disambiguation), multiple people
Blake Austin (born 1991), Australian rugby league footballer
Blessuan Austin (born 1996), American football player
Bobby Austin (disambiguation), multiple people
Brady Austin (born 1993), Canadian ice hockey player
Brenda Austin (born 1981), Argentine politician
Brett Austin (1959–1990), New Zealand swimmer
Brian Austin (born 1943), Australian politician
Buddy Austin (1929–1981), American professional wrestler
Bunny Austin (1906–2000), British tennis player

C
Calvin Austin (born 1999), American football player
Caroline Austin, British molecular biologist
C. G. Austin (1846–1925), American politician
Charles Austin (disambiguation), multiple people
Charlotte Elizabeth Austin (1878–1933), Australian community worker
Chase Austin (born 1989), American race car driver
Chris Austin (1964–1991), American singer
Christopher Austin (born 1968), British conductor
Chuck Austin, American professional wrestler
Claire Austin (1918–1994), American musician
Cliff Austin (born 1960), American football player
Clyde Austin (born 1957), American basketball player
Coco Austin (born 1979), American actress
Coe Finch Austin (1831–1880), American botanist
Colin Austin (disambiguation), multiple people
Cuba Austin (1906–1961), American drummer

D
Dallas Austin (born 1970), American musician
Dan Austin, English sound engineer
Daniel Austin (1935–2013), Pakistani brigadier
Darrell Austin (born 1951), American football player
Daryl Austin (disambiguation), multiple people
David Austin (disambiguation), multiple people
Dean Austin (born 1970), English footballer
Debbie Austin (born 1948), American golfer
Debi Austin (1950–2013), American anti-smoking advocate
Debra Austin (disambiguation), multiple people
Denise Austin (disambiguation), multiple people
Derek Austin (1921–2001), British librarian
Doris Jean Austin (1949–1994), American author and journalist

E
Earl Edwin Austin, American criminal
Eddie Austin (born 1952), Scottish-American soccer player
Edward Austin (disambiguation), multiple people
Edith Austin (1867–1953), English tennis player
Effie Adelaide Payne Austin (1880–1949), American musician
Elizabeth Austin (disambiguation), multiple people
Emilio Lozoya Austin (born 1974), Mexican politician
Eric Austin (born 1974), New Zealand cricketer
Ernest Austin (1874–1947), English composer
Evan Austin (born 1992), American Paralympic swimmer

F
Florence Austin (1884–1927), American violinist
Francis Austin (disambiguation), multiple people
Frank Austin (disambiguation), multiple people
Frederick Austin (disambiguation), multiple people

G
Gary Austin (1941–2017), American theatre director
Gene Austin (1900–1972), American singer
Geoffrey Austin (1837–1902), British army officer
George Austin (disambiguation), multiple people
Gerald Austin (disambiguation), multiple people
Gerry Austin (born 1941), American football official
Gilbert Austin (1753–1837), Irish author
Gilbert Austin (rugby league) (1895–1948), English rugby league footballer
Graeme Austin (born 1952), Australian rules footballer
Granville Austin (1927–2014), American historian
Greg Austin (disambiguation), multiple people
Guerin Austin (born 1980), American television host

H
Harold Austin (1877–1943), Barbadian politician and cricketer
Harold Austin (Australian cricketer) (1903–1981), Australian cricketer
Harriet Austin (disambiguation), multiple people
Harry Austin (1892–1968), English cricketer
Hattie Moseley Austin (1900–1998), American chef
Hedley Austin (born 1960), South African cricketer
Helen Austin (disambiguation), multiple people
Henry Austin (disambiguation), multiple people
Herbert Austin (1866–1941), British entrepreneur
Herschel Austin (1911–1974), British politician
Hise Austin (1950–2019), American football player
Horace Austin (1831–1905), American politician
Horatio Thomas Austin (1800–1865), English naval officer
Hubert Austin (1845–1915), British architect
Hudson Austin (1938–2022), Grenadian military officer
Hunter MacKenzie Austin (born 1972), American actress

I
Ian Austin (born 1965), British politician
Ian Austin (cricketer) (born 1966), English cricketer
Isaac Austin (born 1969), American basketball player
Isaiah Austin (born 1993), American basketball player
Ivy Austin (born 1958), American actress

J
Jack Austin (disambiguation), multiple people
Jake T. Austin (born 1994), American actor
James Austin (disambiguation), multiple people
Jane G. Austin (1831–1894), American writer
Janet Austin (born 1956/1957), Canadian public servant
Jason Austin, Australian rugby league footballer
Jean-Herbert Austin (born 1950), Haitian footballer
Jeff Austin (disambiguation), multiple people
Jeffery Austin (born 1991), American musician
Jehannine Austin, Canadian geneticist
Jennifer Jones Austin (born 1969), American corporate executive
Jere Austin (1876–1927), American actor
Jim Austin (disambiguation), multiple people
J. L. Austin (1911–1960), British philosopher
Joan Austin (1903–1998), British tennis player
Joe Austin, American football player and coach
John Austin (disambiguation), multiple people
Johntá Austin (born 1980), American singer-songwriter
Jonathan Austin (disambiguation), multiple people
Joy Ford Austin, Guyanese-American philanthropist 
Julian Austin (disambiguation), multiple people
Julie Austin, British corporate executive
J. Win Austin, American businessman

K
Karen Austin (born 1955), American actress
Karl Austin (born 1961), English footballer
Kate Austin (1864–1902), American writer
Kathi Lynn Austin (born 1960), American human rights activist
Ken Austin (disambiguation), multiple people
Kent Austin (born 1963), American football player and coach
Kevin Austin (disambiguation), multiple people
Kiera Austin (born 1997), Australian netball player
Kris Austin (born 1979), Canadian politician
Kyle Austin (born 1988), American basketball player

L
Larry Austin (1930–2018), American composer
Lawrence Austin (born 1956), Australian boxer
Les Austin (born 1936), Australian rugby union footballer
Linda Austin (born 1951), American psychiatrist
Lisle Austin (1936–2021), Barbadian football executive
Lloyd Austin (disambiguation), multiple people
Logan Austin (born 1995), Australian rules footballer
Lorena Austin, American politician 
Louis Austin (disambiguation), multiple people
Lovie Austin (1887–1972), American musician
Lynne Austin (born 1961), American model and actress

M
Malcolm Austin (1880–1958), Guyanese cricketer
Margaret Austin (born 1933), New Zealand politician
Mario Austin (born 1982), American basketball player
Margot Austin (1907–1990), American illustrator
Mark Austin (disambiguation), multiple people
Marvin Austin (born 1989), American football player
Mary Austin (disambiguation), multiple people
Matt Austin (disambiguation), multiple people
Maurice Austin (1916–1985), Australian army officer
Mervyn Austin (1913–1991), Australian professor
Michael Austin (disambiguation), multiple people
Michele Austin, British actress
Mick Austin, British artist
Mike Austin (disambiguation), multiple people
Miles Austin (born 1984), American football player
Mitch Austin (born 1991), Australian footballer
Moffitt Austin (1873–1942), Australian cricketer
Moses Austin (1761–1821), American businessman

N
Nancy Austin (born 1949), American writer
Ned Austin (1925–2007), American actor
Neil Austin (disambiguation), multiple people
Neill Austin (1924–2008), New Zealand politician
Nicolas Austin Born in 2010
Nigel Austin (born 1970), Australian entrepreneur
Norvell Austin (born 1958), American professional wrestler

O
Ocie Austin (1947–2014), American football player
Oliver L. Austin (1903–1988), American ornithologist
Oscar P. Austin (1948–1969), American soldier
Oscar Phelps Austin (1847–1933), American statistician
O. V. Austin (1890–1960), American sports coach

P
Pam Austin (born 1950), American tennis player
Pamela Austin (born 1941), American actress
Pat Austin (born 1964), American drag racer
Patti Austin (born 1950), American singer-songwriter
Paul Britten Austin (1922–2005), English author
Pauline Morrow Austin (1916–2011), American physicist
Penelope Austin (born 1989), Australian singer-songwriter
Peter Austin (disambiguation), multiple people
Philip Austin (disambiguation), multiple people
Preston Austin (1827–1908), Welsh clergyman

R
Ralph Austin (disambiguation), multiple people
Ray Austin (disambiguation), multiple people
Rebecca Merritt Smith Leonard Austin (1832–1919), American botanist
Reggie Austin (disambiguation), multiple people
Reneé Austin (born 1966), American singer-songwriter
Rex Austin (1931–2022), New Zealand politician
R. F. E. Austin (1866–1939), British physician
Richard Austin (disambiguation), multiple people
Robert Austin (disambiguation), multiple people
Robin Austin (born 1958), Canadian businessman and politician
Rod Austin (born 1953), Australian rules footballer
Rodney Austin (born 1988), American football player
Rodolph Austin (born 1985), Jamaican footballer
Roger Austin (born 1940), English Air Force officer
Ron Austin (1929–2019), Australian gay rights activist
Roswell M. Austin (1887–1966), American politician
Roy Austin (born 1939), American ambassador
Ryan Austin (born 1981), Trinidadian cricketer
Ryan Austin (footballer) (born 1984), English footballer

S
Samuel Austin (disambiguation), multiple people
Sarah Austin (disambiguation), multiple people
Shakira Austin (born 2000), American basketball player 
Shane Austin (born 1989), American football player
Shawn Austin, Canadian singer
Sherman Austin (born 1983), American anarchist
Sherrié Austin (born 1970), Australian musician
Shrone Austin (born 1989), Seychellois swimmer
Sil Austin (1929–2001), American saxophonist
Sophie Austin (born 1984), English actress
Staryl C. Austin (1920–2015), American Air Force general
Stephanie Austin, American film producer
Stephen F. Austin (1793–1836), American politician
Stephen Austin (American football) (born 1934), American football executive
Steve Austin (disambiguation), multiple people
Susan Austin, American politician
Sydney Austin (1866–1932), Australian cricketer

T
Tal Austin (1857–1941), New Zealand cricketer and rugby union footballer
Tavon Austin (born 1990), American football player
Taylor Austin (born 1990), Canadian bobsledder
Teri Austin (born 1957), Canadian actress
Terrence Austin (born 1988), American football player
Terri Austin (born 1955), American educator and politician
Terry Austin (disambiguation), multiple people
Teryl Austin (born 1965), American football coach
Tex Austin (1886–1938), American rodeo promoter
Thomas Austin (disambiguation), multiple people
Tim Austin (born 1971), American boxer
Tim Austin (musician), American musician
Tje Austin, American singer-songwriter
Tom Austin (disambiguation), multiple people
Tracy Austin (born 1962), American tennis player
Tyler Austin (born 1991), American baseball player

V
Valer Austin, American permaculturalist
Valerie Austin (born 1946), English hypnotherapist
Vivian Austin (1920–2004), American actress

W
Walter W. Austin (1936–2014), American Naval captain
Wanda Austin (born 1954), American corporate executive
Ward Austin (1935–1998), Australian disc jockey
Warren Austin (1877–1962), American ambassador
Wendy Austin, British journalist
William Austin (disambiguation), multiple people
Winifred Austin (1873–1918), British librarian
Woody Austin (born 1964), American golfer

Fictional characters
Meg Austin, character from the television series JAG
Xavier Austin, character from the soap opera Home and Away

See also
General Austin (disambiguation), a disambiguation page for Generals surnamed Austin
Justice Austin (disambiguation), a disambiguation page for Justices surnamed Austin
Senator Austin (disambiguation), a disambiguation page for Senators surnamed Austin

References

English-language surnames
Surnames from given names